Mike Richardson (born June 29, 1950) is an American publisher, writer, and Emmy-winning producer. In 1986, he founded Dark Horse Comics, an award-winning international publishing house located in Milwaukie, Oregon. Richardson is also the founder and President of the Things From Another World retail chain and president of Dark Horse Entertainment, which has developed and produced numerous projects for film and television based on Dark Horse properties or licensed properties.

In addition, he has written numerous graphic novels and comics series, including The Secret, Living with the Dead, and Cut as well as co-authoring two non-fiction books: Comics Between the Panels and Blast Off!.

Early life
Mike Richardson was born June 29, 1950, in Portland, Oregon. His family moved to Milwaukie, a suburb of Portland, in 1955. He is a graduate of Portland State University, where he majored in art and played for the university basketball team.

Career

While in college, Richardson built a list of clients as a freelance artist and had planned on starting an art agency under the name Dark Horse Graphics. In 1980, Richardson quit his job producing art and designing products for a furniture company located in Portland and moved to Bend, Oregon, with his wife, Karie, and their newborn daughter, Michelle. He used a credit card with a $2,500.00 limit to open a small, pop culture retail store. The store’s name, Pegasus Fantasy Books, was chosen off a list of twenty suggestions he submitted to the State of Oregon when applying for a DBA registration. The store opened for business on January 1, 1980. After a name change to Things From Another World in 1993, the original store grew into a chain with as many as eleven locations in three states, including Universal Studio’s CityWalk in Los Angeles and Sony’s Metreon in San Francisco. The success of the on-line TFAW retail site led to a decision to limit expansion plans and, reduce the number of brick-and-mortar locations, in favor of increased emphasis toward online sales.

Dark Horse Comics
Richardson frequently hosted writers and artists at signings in his retail stores. He repeatedly heard these creators complain that they did not own or control the characters they created, a general practice continued from the industry’s earliest days. He began envisioning a comics publishing company that offered intellectual property rights to comics creators. Dark Horse Comics was born, and with the help of Richardson's friend and writer Randy Stradley, released its first publication, Dark Horse Presents #1, in July 1986. Richardson paid 100% of the book’s profits to the creators featured in the book. Hoping to sell 10,000 copies in order to break even, DHP #1 topped the 50,000 sales mark. The company quickly grew from there. Paul Chadwick’s Concrete graduated from the pages of DHP into its own title and became a critical, as well as financial, success. Many of the titles and characters created in the early days of Dark Horse were created, written, or plotted by Richardson and Stradley.

Over the years, Dark Horse published creator-owned projects such as Frank Miller and Geof Darrow’s Hard Boiled, Miller’s Sin City and 300, Mike Mignola's Hellboy, and Eric Powell’s The Goon. Richardson’s interest in Japanese pop culture led to Dark Horse’s early entry into the American manga scene. The company achieved success with major Japanese titles, including Kazuo Koike and Goseki Kojima's Lone Wolf and Cub, Katsuhiro Otomo's Akira, and Masamune Shirow's Ghost in the Shell.  Following these successes, Dark Horse imported Hiroaki Samura's Blade of the Immortal and Kosuke Fujishima's Oh My Goddess! to the United States, where the series' have become two of the longest running Japanese manga titles in the country.

In 1988, Dark Horse introduced a series based on the James Cameron film Aliens. Breaking from comics’ tradition, the series was presented as a direct sequel, continuing the adventures of the film's main characters and related directly to the film’s plot. This approach was repeated by Dark Horse in subsequent series based on films such as Terminator, Predator, Star Wars, and Aliens vs. Predator. This approach to film properties has become standard in the comics industry. Dark Horse is currently the largest privately owned comics company in North America.

Along with his other activities, Richardson continues to write comics. In 2014, his collaboration with Stan Sakai, 47 Ronin, was placed on the American Libraries Teen reading List.

Dark Horse Entertainment
Early on, Dark Horse Comics received attention from the film industry, with producers and studios attempting to option the publisher's titles. From the beginning, Richardson’s goal was to keep Dark Horse and its creators as involved in the development of its titles for entertainment as possible. It quickly became apparent that the only way to assure involvement was to act as a producer on those projects. In 1989, Richardson met producer Larry Gordon, who had heard about the company through his creative executive, Lloyd Levin. Gordon offered him the chance to get involved with a small horror film he was developing, As a result, Richardson set up Dark Horse Productions, later to become Dark Horse Entertainment, and received a co-producer credit on Many Cota’s Dr. Giggles. Two of Richardson’s own creations, The Mask, and Timecop followed in 1994 and both topped the box office charts. In 2008, Richardson received an Emmy as Producer of the John Landis directed documentary, Mr. Warmth, The Don Rickles Project. Richardson and DHE have been involved in producing more than 30 film and television projects since 1992.

Personal life
Richardson is married with children. He names Charles Dickens and James Ellroy as his favorite writers, and The Beatles' Sgt. Pepper's Lonely Hearts Club Band as his favorite album. He is also fond of basketball, guitars, and fine wine. He resides in Lake Oswego, Oregon.

Nominations and awards
1997 Razzie Nomination for Barb Wire
1999 Eisner Awards Nominated Best Comics-Related Book – Comics Between the Panels – (author with Steve Duin)
2007 Emmy Nomination for Hellboy: Sword of Storms
2008 Emmy Award Won for Best Variety, Music, or Comedy Special – Mr. Warmth: The Don Rickles Project (producer)
2010 Overstreet Hall of Fame For contributions to comic book art.
2010 Governors' Gold Award – State of Oregon for Contribution to the Arts
2012 Eisner Awards: Won for Best Anthology – Dark Horse Presents (editor)
2012 Harvey Awards: Won for Best Anthology – Dark Horse Presents (editor)
2013 Eisner Awards: Won for Best Anthology – Dark Horse Presents (editor)
2013 Harvey Awards: Won for Best Anthology – Dark Horse Presents (editor)
2014 Eisner Awards: Won for Best Anthology – Dark Horse Presents (editor)
2012 Harvey Awards: Won for Best Anthology – Dark Horse Presents (editor)
2014 Eisner Awards: Nominated for Best Limited Series – 47 Ronin (writer)
2015 American Library Association named Richardson's 47 Ronin to its Great Graphic Novels for Teens list

Bibliography

Comics

Editor
Cheval Noir (#1 – 23 1989)
Aqua Blue: The Blue Planet (1990)
The Adventures of Luther (#1 – 9, 1990)
Indiana Jones & The Fate (#1 – 4, 1991)
Andrew Vachss’ Hard Looks (#1 – 10, 1992, 1-56971-209-2)
Andrew Vachss' Hard Looks  (1996)
Dark Horse Presents (volume 2, #1 - 30, 2011)		
Dark Horse Presents (volume 3, #1 – 15, 2014)

Writer
Boris the Bear (#1-12, 1986)	
Wacky Squirrel (#1-4, 1987)		
Wacky Squirrel Halloween Special (1987)		
Wacky Squirrel Summer Fun Special (#1, 1987)		
The Mark (1987)		
Godzilla (#1 -6, 1988)	
Insane (#1-2, 1988)		
Indiana Jones and the Fate of Atlantis (#4, 1991)
Aliens: Countdown (1991)		
Predator: The Bloody Sands (story, 1992)		
Aliens: Newt's Tale (1992)		
Comics Greatest World (#1 – 4, 1993)	
Will to Power (#1 - 12, 1994)
The Mask: The Official Movie Adaptation (1994)	
Star Wars: Crimson Empire (1998)
Terror of Godzilla (1999)		
Star Wars: Crimson Empire II: Council of Blood
Star Wars: Crimson Empire: Council (1999)	
Aliens: Genocide (story, 2000)	
The Dark Horse Book of Hauntings: Gone (2003)		
Adventures of the Yellow Jacket (Monarch of the Moon DVD insert comic)	
Cravan: Mystery Man of the 20th Century (2005)
Living With The Dead (2007)
The Secret (#1-4, 2007)
Cut (2008)
Return of the Gremlins (2008)
The Occultist (2012)
Star Wars: Crimson Empire (2012)
47 Ronin (2013)
The Atomic Legion (2014)
Father's Day (2014)
Underground (2014)
Deep Gravity (2015)
Echoes (2016)
51 Deep (2016)

Books
Comics: Between the Panels
Blast Off: Rockets, Rayguns, Robots and Rarities

Filmography

Film

Television

References

External links
 
 
 

Dark Horse Comics
People from Milwaukie, Oregon
1950 births
Living people
American publishers (people)
Film producers from Oregon
Inkpot Award winners